Ultimate Force is a 2005 action film written and directed by Mark Burson. The film stars kickboxing/MMA superstar Mirko Filipović as a tough war veteran. The film was released theatrically in Croatia and directly to video in the United States and most parts of the world.

Plot 
Agent Axon Rey (Filipović), a decorated war hero and former police officer is recruited by a secret government organization and trained to become "Sphinx", an assassin working for an anti-terrorist organization, undertaking missions where failure means death. After failing to execute one of his targets, his life is spared, however, and his supervisor, Janus (Galo), instead sends him to "Gulag 7", a rehabilitation island. Sphinx is forced to face five other government operatives in a battle of life and death. After defeating them, in a jail cell he finds Nina (Mađarević), his former lover, whose death was faked by the Director (Smiljanić). Together they have to team up with Janus to assassinate the Director.

Cast 
 Mirko "Cro Cop" Filipović as Axon Rey/Sphinx
 Božidar Smiljanić as The Director
 Ruža Mađarević as Sari/Nina
 Kishore Mandhyan as Vishnu Prana
 Zvonimir Lučić as Interrogator, the man who tortures Axon Rey
 Matthew Earley as Guggenheim
 Christopher Forbes as Caesar
 Igor Galo as Janus (billed as Igor Gallo)

Reception 
The film received negative reviews. Dragan Antulov of Index.hr, a Croatian daily tabloid, was less enthusiastic about the movie, citing its one-dimensionality and having a low opinion about its directing and special effects, comparing quality of the latter to futuristic' TV shows made in former Yugoslavia during the 1980s." Dustin Somner for Blu-ray.com reviewed the audio and video quality of the film's Blu-ray release, giving it 0.5 stars out of 5, saying the "film sounds like it was made 40 years ago."

Home media 
The films was released on Blu-ray on 13 November 2007.

References

External links 
 
 

2005 action films
2005 films
American action films
English-language Croatian films
Films shot in Croatia
2005 martial arts films
Croatian action films
2000s English-language films
2000s American films